Bodman Point is a rocky headland which is situated centrally on the northwest coast of Seymour Island in the James Ross Island group. It was first surveyed by the Swedish Antarctic Expedition under Otto Nordenskiöld, 1901–04, who named it Cape Bodman after Dr. Gosta Bodman, hydrographer and meteorologist with the expedition. It was re-surveyed by the Falkland Islands Dependencies Survey in 1952. Point is considered a more suitable descriptive term for this feature than cape.

References
 

Headlands of the James Ross Island group